Nepalis in Singapore comprise migrants from Nepal to Singapore, including temporary expatriates and permanent residents, as well as their locally born descendants.

Migration history
The first wave of Nepalese immigration began since British Gurkha Army. Gurkha (Singapore Police)

Organisations
The Non-Resident Nepali Association of Singapore is one organisation for Nepalese people living in Singapore.

References

External links
 https://www.facebook.com/NepaleseSocietySG

Demographics of Singapore
Singapore